Lakeside High School can refer to several different schools:

 Lakeside High School (Hot Springs, Arkansas)
 Lakeside High School (Lake Village, Arkansas)
 Lakeside High School (Lake Elsinore, California)
 Lakeside High School (DeKalb County, Georgia)
 Lakeside High School (Evans, Georgia)
 Lakeside High School (Plummer, Idaho)
 Lakeside High School (Downs, Kansas)
Lakeside High School (Sibley, Louisiana)
 Lakeside High School (Wilmington, North Carolina)
 Lakeside High School (Ashtabula, Ohio)
 Lakeside High School (Nine Mile Falls, Washington), Nine Mile Falls, Washington
 Lakeside School (Seattle)

See also
Lakeside School (disambiguation)
Lakeside School District (disambiguation)
Lakeside (disambiguation)
Lakeside Academy (disambiguation)
Lakeside College